The Ambassador Extraordinary and Plenipotentiary of Turkey to Iran is the official representative of the President and the Government of Turkey to the President and the Government of Iran.

The ambassador and their staff work at large in the Embassy of Turkey in Tehran. There are Consulate Generals in Mashad, Urmia and Tabriz.

The post of Turkish Ambassador to Iran is currently held by Derya Örs.

References 

 
Iran
Turkey